Vic Anselmo (born Viktorija Kukule; 21 March 1985, in Riga, Latvia) is a Latvian singer-songwriter who lives in Bochum, Germany. Starting out as a performer of gothic metal, Vic performed with her own band throughout her whole career amongst co-operations with several other musicians.

After she moved to Germany, Vic decided to adjust her performance to the singer-songwriter genre. Vic finds her inspiration for her self-written music in bands, artists and composers such as Ella Fitzgerald, Lisa Gerrard, Edvard Grieg, Queen, Alice in Chains, Tom Waits, and Devin Townsend. Her music accounts for the way to express her emotions by solely using her voice that is often referred to as "stunning". Her albums, with a wide range from sensitive ballads to shades of blues and folk, are often themed on her state of mind at that time. Her artist name is derived from the surname of Phil Anselmo, singer of the American metal band Pantera which she was a fan of in her youth.

Career
Throughout her career, Vic was also involved in several interesting co-operations with the likes of Mick Moss (Antimatter), Anneke van Giersbergen (ex-The Gathering) and Duncan Patterson (ex-Anathema) amongst others.

In 2006 she released a demo-CD named Beverly. Later she released two CD's Trapped in a Dream (2008) and In My Fragile (2011). The latter album was released by Danse Macabre Records after label head Bruno Kramm became interested in Anselmo's cover of "Das dunkle Land".

In 2011 she was the opening act for the dark wave band Deine Lakaien.

On 2 October 2015 her new album Who Disturbs The Water was released.

Festivals and tours 
 2008 Trapped in a Dream European Tour
 2009 Wave-Gotik-Treffen (DE)
 2009 Castle Party (PL)
 2010 Waregem Gothic Festival (BE)
 2010 Dark Mills (London, UK)
 February 2011 – Tour with Deine Lakaien In My Fragile European Tour
 August/September 2011 – Tour in China with To Die For
 2012 Gothic & Fantasy Fair (Rijswijk, NL)
 2012/2013/2014 Castlefest (NL)
 March/April 2013 tour with Antimatter
 January/February 2015 – Latin America Tour with The Sirens
 November 2015 – German Tour with Samsas Traum

Discography

Albums
Trapped in a Dream, 2008
In My Fragile, 2011
Who Disturbs the Water, 2015

EPs
Backyard Novelties (Digital EP), 2016

References

External links

 
 Discography at Discogs
 Discography at AllMusic
  Interview with Vic Anselmo by Dark Entries (archive)
 Interview with Vic Anselmo by Lords of Metal (archive)

Gothic metal musical groups
Anselmo